Billy Bridges (born 22 March 1984) is a Canadian ice sledge hockey and wheelchair basketball player. Born in Summerside, he has spina bifida. On July 1, 2011, Bridges married former Olympic women's ice hockey player Sami Jo Small. He competed at the 2022 Winter Paralympics, in Para ice hockey winning a silver medal.

Life 
He began playing ice sledge hockey in 1997, aged 12, for the Kitchener Sidewinders. Aged 14, he was selected for Canada's national team, the youngest player ever to be picked. He has World Championship golds from 2000, 2008, 2013 and 2017 and Paralympic gold from 2006, where he was picked for the All-Star Team.

As well as ice sledge hockey, he has a career as a wheelchair basketball player, including seven Canadian titles with Team Ontario. In 2001, he also competed at the Junior World Championships, and in 2005 was selected as the team's most valuable player (MVP).

He completed at the 2019 World Para Ice Hockey Championships, and 2021 World Para Ice Hockey Championships, winning silver medals.

Honours

 2010 Winter Paralympics
 4th place in ice sledge hockey
 2009 IPC Ice Sledge Hockey World Championships
 Bronze
 2008 IPC Ice Sledge Hockey World Championships
 Gold
 2006 Winter Paralympics
 Gold in ice sledge hockey
 2004 IPC Ice Sledge Hockey World Championships
 4th place
 2002 Winter Paralympics
 4th place
 2000 IPC Ice Sledge Hockey World Championships
 Gold (2-1 against Norway)

Career stats

Hockey Canada

References

External links
 
 
 
 
 

1984 births
Living people
Canadian sledge hockey players
Paralympic sledge hockey players of Canada
Paralympic gold medalists for Canada
Paralympic bronze medalists for Canada
Ice sledge hockey players at the 2010 Winter Paralympics
Ice sledge hockey players at the 2014 Winter Paralympics
Para ice hockey players at the 2018 Winter Paralympics
Para ice hockey players at the 2022 Winter Paralympics
Medalists at the 2006 Winter Paralympics
Medalists at the 2014 Winter Paralympics
Medalists at the 2018 Winter Paralympics
Medalists at the 2022 Winter Paralympics
People from Summerside, Prince Edward Island
People with spina bifida
Paralympic medalists in sledge hockey